Bill Longley (11 November 1911 in Dandenong, Victoria – 15 April 2005) was an Australian international speedway rider who began his British career with the New Cross Rangers in 1937, where he remained until the outbreak of World War II, winning the National League Championship in 1938.

Career summary
In 1946 he rode for Odsal but returned to New Cross in 1947 and was again a member of the team  that won the 1948 National League Championship. Longley finished ninth in the Speedway World Championship in 1949 and remained with New Cross until they closed in 1953. He joined Bradford for a short spell with the Tudors before returning to London with the Wimbledon Dons.

In 1950, he finished runner up in the Australian Championship.

Longley was a member of the Wimbledon team that won the 1954 National League Championship. In 1955 he had a short spell with the Rayleigh Rockets before riding in one meeting for the Wembley Lions. He then decided to retire.

World Final Appearances
1949 –  London, Wembley Stadium – 9th – 8pts

References 

1911 births
2005 deaths
Australian speedway riders
New Cross Rangers riders
Wimbledon Dons riders
Wembley Lions riders
Rayleigh Rockets riders
Sportspeople from Melbourne
Sportsmen from Victoria (Australia)
People from Dandenong, Victoria
Australian expatriate sportspeople in England